Zarrin Choqa is a village in Kermanshah Province, Iran.

Zarrin Choqa, also rendered as Zarrin Chogha, may also refer to:

Zarrin Chogha Shahid Jabari, Lorestan Province
Zarrin Chogha-ye Olya, Lorestan Province
Zarrin Chogha-ye Sofla, Lorestan Province